Blandford St Mary is a village and civil parish in the North Dorset district of Dorset, England. The village is on the south bank of the River Stour, immediately opposite the larger town of Blandford Forum.  The village grew up around the Badger Brewery, owned by Hall and Woodhouse, which is based there. At the 2001 census it had a population of 1,233. The appropriate electoral ward is called 'Portman' with naturally the most populous area being south of the river. The ward includes Bryanston School and also runs south west almost to Thornicombe. The total ward population at the abovementioned census was 2,436.

Blandford St Mary has a busy Tesco supermarket and fuel station and a Homebase DIY store which attracts shoppers from the many villages that surround the Blandford area. In addition there are a number of offices in Stour Park. In the residential area there is a new housing estate and  primary school. An older area of the village near the river bridge to Blandford Forum has a traditional public house and a village green. Opposite is the old stone gate at the entrance of the Bryanston School estate. Outline planning permission has been given to redevelop the Hall & Woodhouse brewery site to include new offices and 200 new homes.

Lower Blandford St Mary is a rural outpost of Blandford St Mary, in the farm fields to the south across the bypass road, with a small church and graveyard, and one or two historic houses.

The Dorset Central Railway, which opened on 1 November 1860 from the LSWR station at Wimborne, had a station in the village, serving the neighbouring important market town of Blandford Forum. This was demolished when the line amalgamated to be part of the Somerset & Dorset Railway, and a bridge was built over the river Stour to the station at Blandford.

References

External links

Civil parishes in Dorset
North Dorset District
Villages in Dorset